Yvonne Useldinger (née Hostert; 6 November 1921 – 11 February 2009) was a Luxembourgian politician. She was the wife of Arthur Useldinger from 1940 to his death in 1978.

Life

Yvonne Hostert was born in Differdange, and became in 1937 a member of the Young Socialists. In 1938 she joined the Communist Party of Luxembourg. In 1940 she married Arthur Useldinger, a senior figure in the Communist Party. In 1941 she was arrested by the Gestapo, but was released due to a lack of evidence against her. A year later, by which time she had become pregnant, she was arrested again, with her parents and brother. Her daughter, Fernande, was born in a jail in Trier. In late June 1943 she was deported to Ravensbrück concentration camp, where she later became a member of an illegal underground organisation.

Her father was deported first to Hinzert concentration camp, later to Mauthausen; her brother was sent to Dachau. Her mother was released, and took care of Yvonne's baby.

Yvonne Useldinger was transferred in December 1944, from Ravensbrück camp to a secondary camp, which had been built nearby by Siemens. After Ravensbrück was liberated by the Red Army, Useldinger was in late April 1945 evacuated to Sweden by the Swedish Red Cross. Shortly after, she returned to Luxembourg.

In 1945 she co-founded the Union des Femmes Luxembourgeoises (UFL), of which she later became the president.

Her diary is one of the few documents that survive from Ravensbrück camp.

Further reading 
 Meß, Kathrin: "...als fiele  ein Sonnenschein in meine einsame Zelle": Das Tagebuch der Luxemburgerin  Yvonne Useldinger aus dem Frauen-KZ Ravensbrück. Metropol 2008. 
 Meß, Kathrin: "Yvonne Useldinger – eine Luxemburgerin im Frauen-KZ Ravensbrück". In: Forum für Politik, Gesellschaft und Kultur. Luxembourg, Nr. 259 (Sept. 2006), p. 48–52.
 Kathrin Meß: "Dann habe ich keinen Hunger mehr gespürt ..." Kunst zwischen Widerstand, Zeugnis und Überlebensstrategie im Frauen-Konzentrationslager Ravensbrück am Beispiel der Luxemburgerin Yvonne Useldinger. Differdingen: Institut für Geschichte und Soziales Luxemburg, 2019, 
 Schwarz, Helga / Szepansky, Gerda [eds.]: Frauen-KZ Ravensbrück ... und dennoch blühten Blumen. Dokumente, Berichte, Gedichte und Zeichnungen vom Lageralltag 1939–1945. Brandenburgische Landeszentrale für politische Bildung, Potsdam 2000, p. 108 and 166f.

External links 
Page from her diary, drawing and photos of Yvonne Useldinger

References 

1921 births
2009 deaths
Communist Party of Luxembourg politicians
People from Steinfort
20th-century Luxembourgian politicians
20th-century Luxembourgian women politicians
People from Differdange